George Herbert Leigh Mallory (18 June 1886 – 8 or 9 June 1924) was an English mountaineer who took part in the first three British expeditions to Mount Everest in the early 1920s.

Born in Cheshire, Mallory became a student at Winchester College, where a teacher recruited him for an excursion in the Alps and he developed a strong natural ability for climbing. After graduating from Magdalene College, Cambridge, he taught at Charterhouse School whilst honing his skills as a climber in the Alps and the English Lake District. He served in the British Army during the First World War and fought at the Somme.

After the war, Mallory returned to Charterhouse before resigning to participate in the 1921 British Mount Everest reconnaissance expedition. In 1922, he took part in a second expedition to make the first ascent of the world's highest mountain, in which his team achieved a record altitude of  without supplemental oxygen. Once asked by a reporter why he wanted to climb Everest, Mallory famously replied, "Because it’s there."

During the 1924 expedition, Mallory and his climbing partner, Andrew "Sandy" Irvine, disappeared on the northeast ridge of Everest. The last sighting of the pair was approximately 800 vertical feet (245 m) from the summit. Mallory's fate was unknown for 75 years until his body was discovered on 1 May 1999 by a research expedition that had set out to search for the climbers' remains. Whether Mallory and Irvine reached the summit before they died remains a subject of debate, various theories, and continuing research.

Early life, education, and teaching career
George Mallory was born in Mobberley, Cheshire, the son of Herbert Leigh-Mallory (1856–1943), a clergyman who changed his surname from Mallory to Leigh-Mallory in 1914. His mother was Annie Beridge (1863–1946), the daughter of a clergyman in Walton, Derbyshire. George had two sisters and a younger brother, Trafford Leigh-Mallory, the World War II Royal Air Force commander. His parents  raised him in a ten-bedroom house on Hobcroft Lane in Mobberley.

In 1896, Mallory attended Glengorse, a boarding school in Eastbourne on the south coast, having transferred from another preparatory school in West Kirby. At 13, he won a mathematics scholarship to Winchester College. In his final year there, a master, R. L. G. Irving, who took several people climbing in the Alps each year, introduced him to rock climbing and mountaineering. 

In October 1905, Mallory entered Magdalene College, Cambridge, to study history. Mallory was a keen oarsman who rowed for his college. 

While at Cambridge University, he became good friends with future members of the Bloomsbury Group, including Rupert Brooke, John Maynard Keynes, James Strachey, Lytton Strachey, and Duncan Grant, who took some portraits of Mallory. 

After gaining his degree, Mallory stayed in Cambridge for a year writing an essay he published as Boswell the Biographer (1912). He lived briefly in France afterward. In 1910, he began teaching at Charterhouse School, another of England's great public schools, where he met the poet Robert Graves, then a pupil. In his autobiography, Goodbye to All That, Graves remembered Mallory fondly, both for the encouragement of his interest in literature and poetry, and his instruction in climbing. Graves recalled: "He (Mallory) was wasted (as a teacher) at Charterhouse. He tried to treat his class in a friendly way, which puzzled and offended them."

While at Charterhouse, Mallory met his wife, Ruth Turner (1892–1942), who lived in Godalming, Surrey, and they were married in 1914, six days before Britain entered the First World War. George and Ruth had two daughters and a son: Frances Clare (1915–2001), Beridge Ruth, known as "Berry" (1917–1953), and John (1920–2011).

During the First World War, in December 1915, Mallory was commissioned in the Royal Garrison Artillery as a second lieutenant and was promoted to lieutenant on 1 July 1917. He served in France and fought at the Battle of the Somme. Mallory relinquished his commission on 21 February 1920, retaining the rank of lieutenant.

After the war, Mallory returned to Charterhouse, but resigned in 1921 to join the first British expedition of Mount Everest. Between expeditions, he attempted to make a living from writing and lecturing, with only partial success. In 1923, he took a job as a lecturer with the Cambridge University Extramural Studies Department. He was given temporary leave so that he could join the 1924 Everest attempt.

Climbing

In Europe
In 1910, in a party led by Irving, Mallory and a friend attempted to climb Mont Vélan in the Alps, but turned back shortly before the summit due to Mallory's altitude sickness. In 1911, Mallory climbed Mont Blanc, and made the third ascent of the Frontier ridge of Mont Maudit in a party again led by Irving. According to Helmut Dumler, Mallory was "apparently prompted by a friend on the Western Front in 1916 [to write] a highly emotional article of his ascent of this great climb"; this article was published as "Mont Blanc from the Col du Géant by the Eastern Buttress of Mont Maudit" in the Alpine Journal and contained his question, "Have we vanquished an enemy?" [i.e., the mountain] to which he responded, "None but ourselves."

By 1913, Mallory had ascended Pillar Rock in the English Lake District, with no assistance, by what is now known as "Mallory's Route"—currently graded Hard Very Severe 5a (Yosemite Decimal Rating 5.9). It is likely to have been the hardest route in Britain for many years.

One of Mallory's closest friends and climbing companions was a young woman named Cottie Sanders, who became a novelist with the pseudonym of Ann Bridge. The nature of their relationship is elusive; Sanders was either a "climbing friend" or a "casual sweetheart". After Mallory died, Cottie wrote a memoir of him, which was never published, but provided much of the material used by later biographers such as David Pye and David Robertson and the novel Everest Dream.

In Asia

Mallory participated in the initial 1921 Mount Everest expedition, organised and financed by the Mount Everest Committee, that explored routes up to Everest's North Col. The expedition produced the first accurate maps of the region around the mountain, as Mallory, his climbing partner Guy Bullock, and E. O. Wheeler of the Survey of India explored in depth several approaches to its peak. Under Mallory's leadership, and with the assistance of around a dozen Sherpas, the group climbed several lower peaks near Everest. His party were almost certainly the first Westerners to view the Western Cwm at the foot of the Lhotse face, as well as charting the course of the Rongbuk Glacier up to the base of the North Face. After circling the mountain from the south side, his party finally discovered the East Rongbuk Glacier—the highway to the summit now used by nearly all climbers on the Tibetan side of the mountain. By climbing up to the saddle of the North Ridge (the  North Col), they spied a route to the summit via the North-East Ridge over the obstacle of the Second Step.

In 1922, Mallory returned to the Himalayas as part of the party led by Brigadier General Charles Bruce and climbing leader Edward Strutt, with a view to making a serious attempt on the summit. Eschewing their bottled oxygen, which was at the time seen as going against the spirit of mountaineering, Mallory, along with Howard Somervell and Edward Norton, almost reached the crest of the North-East Ridge. Despite being hampered and slowed by the thin air, they achieved a record altitude of  before weather conditions and the late hour forced them to retreat. A second party led by George Finch reached an elevation around  using bottled oxygen both for climbing and—a first—for sleeping. The party climbed at record speeds, a fact that Mallory seized upon during the next expedition.

Mallory organised a third unsuccessful attempt on the summit, departing as the monsoon season arrived.  On 7 June 1922, while he was leading a group of porters down the lower slopes of the North Col of Everest in fresh, waist-deep snow, an avalanche swept over the group, killing seven Sherpas. The attempt was immediately abandoned, and Mallory was subsequently accused of poor judgement, including by expedition participants such as Dr. Longstaff.

Mallory is famously quoted as having replied to the question, "Why did you want to climb Mount Everest?" with the retort, "Because it's there", which has been called "the most famous three words in mountaineering".<ref
name="supermen"></ref> Questions have arisen over the authenticity of the quote, and whether Mallory actually said it. Some have suggested that it was a paraphrase by a newspaper reporter, but scrutiny of the original Times report leaves this unresolved. The phrase was certainly consistent with the direct quotes cited in the report, so it appears not to misrepresent Mallory's attitude.

Mallory's last climb

June 1924 expedition to Everest

Mallory joined the 1924 Everest expedition, led, as in 1922, by Gen. Charles Bruce. Mallory, who was 37 at the time of the expedition, believed his age would make this his last opportunity to climb the mountain, and when touring the US proclaimed that the expedition would successfully reach the summit.

Mallory and Bruce had made the first attempt, which was inexplicably aborted by Mallory at Camp 5. Norton and Somervell then set off from Camp 6, and in perfect weather, Norton managed, without oxygen, to reach , a new record height.

Mallory had been converted from his original scepticism about oxygen usage by his failure on his initial assault and recalling the very rapid ascent of Finch in 1922.

At 08:40 on 6 June, they set off, climbing to Camp 5. On 7 June, they reached Camp 6. Mallory wrote he had used only  of one bottle of oxygen for the two days, which suggests a climb rate of some 856 vertical feet per hour.

On 8 June, expedition member Noel Odell was moving up behind the pair in a "support role". Around , he spotted the two climbing a prominent rock step, either the First or Second Step, about 13:00, although Odell might, conceivably, have been viewing the higher, then-unknown, "Third Step". 

At the time, Odell observed that one of the men surmounted the Second Step on the northeast ridge. Apart from his testimony, there has been no discovery of physical evidence to suggest that Mallory and Irvine climbed higher than the First Step. One of their oxygen cylinders was recovered from below the First Step by Tap Richards on 17 May 1999, and Irvine's ice axe was discovered nearby in 1933. They never returned to their camp.

Presumably, Mallory and Irvine died either late the same evening or on 9 June. The news of Mallory and Irvine's disappearance was widely mourned in Britain and the two were hailed as national heroes. A memorial service was held in London at St Paul's Cathedral on 17 October and was attended by a great assembly of family, friends, and dignitaries including King George V and members of the royal family, Prime Minister Ramsay MacDonald, and his entire Cabinet.

Mallory's will was proven in London on 17 December; he bequeathed his estate of £1706 17s. 6d. (roughly equivalent to £ in ) to his wife.

Lost on Everest for 75 years
After their disappearance, several expeditions tried to find their remains, and perhaps, determine if they had reached the summit. Frank Smythe, when on the 1936 expedition, believed he spotted a body below the place where Irvine's ice axe had been found three years earlier, "I was scanning the face from base camp through a high-powered telescope...when I saw something queer in a gully below the scree shelf. Of course, it was a long way away and very small, but I've a six/six eyesight and do not believe it was a rock. This object was at precisely the point where Mallory and Irvine would have fallen had they rolled on over the scree slopes," Smythe wrote in a letter to Edward Felix Norton. He kept the discovery quiet as he feared press sensationalism, and it was not revealed until 2013, after the letter was found by his son when preparing his biography.

On the last day of the expedition, Holzel met with Zhang Junyan, who reiterated that, despite official denials from the Chinese Mountaineering Association, Wang had come back from a short excursion and described finding "a foreign mountaineer" at "8,100 m." Wang was killed in an avalanche the day after delivering his verbal report, so the location was never more precisely fixed.

In 1999, the Mallory and Irvine Research Expedition, sponsored in part by the TV show Nova and the BBC, and organised and led by Eric Simonson, arrived at Everest to search for the lost pair. They were surprised to find that name tags on the body's clothing bore the name of "G. Leigh Mallory." The body was well preserved, due to the freezing conditions. A brass altimeter, a stag-handled lambsfoot pocket knife with leather slip-case, and an unbroken pair of snow-goggles were recovered from the pockets of the clothing. Personal effects, including a letter and a bill from a London supplier of climbing equipment, confirmed the identity of the body. The team could not, however, locate the camera that the two climbers took to document their final summit attempt. Experts from Kodak have said that if a camera is ever found, some chance exists that its film could be developed to produce printable images, if extraordinary measures are taken, and have provided guidance as to handling of such a camera and the film inside, in the event that such were found in the investigation. Before leaving the site of Mallory's death, the expedition conducted an Anglican service for the climber and covered his remains with a cairn on the mountain.

Sir Edmund Hillary, who with Tenzing Norgay is credited with reaching the Everest summit first, welcomed news of the discovery of Mallory's body and described as "very appropriate" the possibility that Mallory might turn out to have summited decades earlier. "He was really the initial pioneer of the whole idea of climbing Mount Everest," Hillary said.

The 1999 research team returned to the mountain in 2001 to conduct further research. They discovered Mallory and Irvine's last camp, but failed to find either Irvine or a camera. Another initiative in 2004 also proved fruitless.

In 2007, the Altitude Everest Expedition, led by Conrad Anker, who had found Mallory's body, tried to retrace Mallory's last steps.

Reaching the summit

Whether Mallory and Irvine reached Everest's summit is unknown. The question remains open to speculation and is the topic of much debate and research.

Mallory's body
Judging by a serious rope-jerk injury around Mallory's waist, which was encircled by the remnants of a climbing rope, he and Irvine were apparently roped together when one of them slipped. Mallory's body lay 300 metres (1000 ft) below and about 100 metres (300 ft) horizontal to the location of an ice axe found in 1933, which is generally accepted from three characteristic marks on the shaft as belonging to Irvine. That the body was relatively unbroken, apart from fractures to the right leg (the tibia and fibula were broken just above the boot), as compared to other bodies in the same location that were known to have fallen from the North-East Ridge, strongly suggests that Mallory could not have fallen from the ice axe site, but must have fallen from much lower down. When found, his body was sun-bleached, frozen, and mummified.

The other significant find on Mallory's body was a severe, golf ball-sized puncture wound in his forehead, the likely cause of his death. The unusual puncture wound is consistent with one inflicted by an ice axe, leading some to conclude that, while Mallory was descending in a self-arrest "glissade", sliding down a slope while dragging his ice axe in the snow to control the speed of his descent, his ice axe may have struck a rock and bounced off, striking him fatally.

Two items of circumstantial evidence from the body suggest that he attempted, or reached, the summit:
 Mallory's daughter said he carried a photograph of his wife on his person with the intention of leaving it on the summit. The photograph was not found on Mallory's body. Given the excellent preservation of the body, its garments, and other items including documents in his wallet, this points to the possibility that he reached the summit and left the photo there. On the other hand, Wang (who is known to have taken Mallory's ice axe) might also have taken the photograph for identification purposes, and no one who has subsequently reached the summit has reported seeing any evidence of the photograph or any other trace of their presence there.

 Mallory's unbroken snow goggles were found in his pocket, suggesting that Irvine and he had made a push for the summit and were descending after sunset. On his attempt a few days earlier, Norton had suffered serious snow blindness because he did not wear his goggles, so Mallory would be unlikely to have dispensed with them in daylight, and given their known departure time and movements, it is unlikely that they would have still been out by nightfall had they not attempted the summit pyramid. An alternative scenario is that Mallory carried an extra pair and the pair he was wearing was torn off in his fall.

The difficult "Second Step"
Experienced modern climbers have mixed views on whether Mallory was capable of climbing the Second Step on the North Ridge, now surmounted by a  aluminium ladder first permanently fixed in place by Chinese climbers in 1975 to bridge this very difficult pitch. Austrian Theo Fritsche repeated the free climb solo in 2001 under conditions that resembled those encountered during the 1924 Everest expedition, and assessed the climb as having a grade of 5.6–5.7. Fritsche completed the climb without supplementary oxygen and believes that Mallory could, weather permitting, have reached the summit.

In June 2007, as part of the 2007 Altitude Everest expedition, Conrad Anker and Leo Houlding free-climbed the Second Step, having first removed the Chinese ladder (which was later replaced). Houlding rated the climb at 5.9, just within Mallory's estimated capabilities. The climb was part of an expedition which tried to recreate the 1924 climb. Eight years earlier, Anker had climbed the Second Step as part of the Mallory and Irvine Research Expedition, but had used one point of aid by stepping on a rung of the ladder, which blocked the only available foothold. At that time, he had rated the climb at 5.10, which he considered to be beyond Mallory's capabilities, but after the June 2007 climb, he changed his view and said that he "could have climbed it".

Noel Odell believed that he had seen Mallory and Irvine ascend the Second Step, but eventually changed his story to say it was the First Step. Towards the end of his life, however, he reaffirmed his original view. Recent observations taken from Odell's vantage point by other climbers suggest that Odell would have probably seen the men at the Second Step as he had initially reported.

Possible sightings of Irvine
Wang was killed in an avalanche the day after this verbal report, so the location was never more precisely fixed. The Chinese Mountaineering Association officially denied the sighting claim. In 1986, Chinese climber Zhang Junyan—who had been sharing the tent with Wang in 1975—confirmed, to Tom Holzel, Wang's report of finding a foreign climber's body. Zhang stated that Wang had been out for only 20 minutes. If this report was accurate, at that altitude and date, the body must have been that of Irvine.

Wang's sighting was the key to the discovery of Mallory's body 24 years later in the same general area, though Wang's reported description of the body he found, face up, with a "hole in cheek", is not consistent with the condition and posture of Mallory's body, which was face down, his head almost completely buried in scree, and with a golf ball-sized puncture wound on his forehead. The 2001 research expedition discovered Wang's campsite location and extensively searched its surroundings. Mallory's remained the only ancient body in the vicinity.

In 2001, another Chinese climber, Xu Jing, claimed to have seen the body of Andrew Irvine in 1960—reported in Hemmleb and Simonson's Detectives on Everest—although testimony is uncertain with regard to the location of his find. On two occasions, Xu placed it between Camps VI and VII (the Yellow Band, around ), though later changed it to the NE Ridge between the First and Second Steps (near  and directly on the NE Ridge. In spite of several such rumoured and reported sightings, subsequent searches of these locations on the North Face have failed to find any trace of Irvine.

American researcher Tom Holzel reported that Xu Jing had spotted the body as he descended "by a more direct route" due to exhaustion while his teammates had continued their ascent. The body was supposedly lying on its back in a narrow slot, its feet pointing towards the summit, and its face blackened from frostbite.

In July 2005, the Alpine Club of St. Petersburg, Russia, published an article to commemorate the 45th anniversary of the North Face climb by the Chinese expedition in 1960. The article referred to the presentation by Wang Fuzhou—a member of the group which reached the summit of Everest on 25 May 1960—given by him in Leningrad before the USSR Geographical Society in 1965.

Theories
Various outcomes and new theories about their fate continue. Most views have both climbers, carrying two cylinders of oxygen each, reaching and climbing either the First or Second Step, where Odell sees them. At this point, two conjectures remain: Mallory takes Irvine's oxygen and goes on alone (and may or may not reach the summit), or both go on together until they turn back (having used up their oxygen or realising that they will do so before the summit). In either case, Mallory slips and falls to his death while descending, perhaps caught in the fierce snowstorm that sent Odell to take shelter in their tent. Irvine either falls with him or, in the first scenario, dies alone of exhaustion and hypothermia high up on the ridge. The hypothesis advanced by Tom Holzel in February 2008 is that Odell sighted Mallory and Irvine climbing the First Step for a final look around while they were descending from a failed summit bid.

Assessments by other climbers

Ang Tsering's assessment
Ang Tsering, a Sherpa member of the 1924 British Everest Expedition, was interviewed in 2000 by Jonathan Neale, who recounted:

Climbing partners
Harry Tyndale, one of Mallory's climbing partners, said of Mallory:

Geoffrey Winthrop Young, an accomplished mountain climber, held Mallory's ability in awe:

First "real" ascent, or just to the summit?
If evidence were found that showed that Mallory or Irvine had reached the summit of Everest in 1924, advocates of Hillary and Norgay's first ascent maintain that the historical record should not be changed to state that Mallory and Irvine made the first ascent. 1965 Mount Everest summiteer H. P. S. Ahluwalia claims that without photographic proof, no evidence shows that Mallory reached the summit and "it would be unfair to say that the first man to scale Mount Everest was George Mallory". Mallory's son John Mallory, who was three years old when his father died, said, "To me, the only way you achieve a summit is to come back alive. The job is only half done if you don't get down again".

Edmund Hillary's assessment
Edmund Hillary echoed John Mallory's opinion, asking:

Hillary's daughter, Sarah, when asked about her father's take on the debate, said, "His view was that he had got 50 good years out of being conqueror of Everest, and, whatever happened, he wasn't particularly worried. That's my feeling as well."

Chris Bonington's assessment
Chris Bonington, the British mountaineer, argued:

Conrad Anker's assessment
Conrad Anker, who found Mallory's body in 1999, free climbed the Second Step in 2007 and has worn replica 1924 climbing gear on Everest, said he believes it is "possible, but highly improbable, that they made it to the top", citing the difficulty of the Second Step and the position of Mallory's body. He said that in his opinion:

Robert Graves' tale of Mallory's Pipe
Robert Graves, who climbed with Mallory, in his autobiography, recounts this story, at the time famous in climbing circles, about an ascent that Mallory made as a young man in 1908:

The route is now called "Mallory's Slab", a hard V Diff on Y Lliwedd.

Legacy
 Mallory was honoured by having a court named after him at his alma mater, Magdalene College, Cambridge, with an inscribed stone commemorating his death set above the doorway to one of the buildings. The Friends of Magdalene Boat Club was renamed the Mallory Club in recognition of his achievements in exploration and rowing at the college. Two high peaks in California's Sierra Nevada, Mount Mallory and Mount Irvine, located a few miles southeast of Mount Whitney, were named after them.  

The Times obituary of George Finch called Mallory and Finch the "two best alpinists of [their] time".

During Mallory's fundraising lecture tour in USA in 1923, he was asked why he wanted to climb Everest. His answer, 'Because it’s there',  became famous almost overnight and has been quoted frequently ever since. Mallory and the phrase were referenced by President John F Kennedy on 12 September 1962 in his address at Rice University on the nation's space effort (often dubbed the 'We Choose to go to the Moon' speech), regarded as one of the greatest speeches of the 20th century.

Mallory was captured on film by expedition cameraman John Noel, who released his film of the 1924 expedition, The Epic of Everest. Some of his footage was also used in George Lowe's 1953 documentary The Conquest of Everest. A documentary on the 2001 Mallory and Irvine Research Expedition, Found on Everest, was produced by Riley Morton. Mallory was played by Brian Blessed in the 1991 re-creation of his last climb, Galahad of Everest. 

In September 2009, a special temporary exhibition on Mallory and Irvine opened at the Salt Museum (now Weaver Hall Museum), Northwich, Cheshire. This is a town close to the village of Mobberley, the birthplace of George Mallory. The exhibition, 'Above the Clouds: Mallory & Irvine and the Quest for Everest' was curated by Matt Wheeler and featured many artefacts  sourced from a range of institutions (including the Royal Geographical Society) and individuals relating to both men. It represented one of the most comprehensive exhibitions ever conducted on Mallory and Irvine and was shortlisted at the British Museum and Heritage Awards for Excellence. The exhibition travelled on to the Williamson Art Gallery & Museum, Birkenhead, the birthplace of Sandy Irvine.

In Anthony Geffen's 2010 documentary film about Mallory's life and final expedition, The Wildest Dream, Conrad Anker and Leo Houlding attempted to reconstruct the climb, dressed and equipped like Mallory and Irvine.

Everest, a proposed Hollywood version of the 1924 attempt, adapted from Jeffrey Archer's 2009 novel Paths of Glory, to be directed by Doug Liman, had first Tom Hardy and then Benedict Cumberbatch slated to play Mallory, but a June 2014 interview with Liman implied that the film was no longer in production. As of late 2021, it is in production again, with Liman directing and Ewan McGregor starring as Mallory. In April 2015, it was announced that Michael Sheen would play Mallory in a biopic titled In High Places, to be written and directed by James McEachen, but as of 2020, McEachen's website stated that it had not been funded.

Tragedy in the mountains has proved a recurring theme in the Mallory line. Mallory's younger brother, Air Chief Marshal Sir Trafford Leigh-Mallory, met his death on a mountain range when the Avro York carrying him to his new appointment as Air Commander-in-Chief of South East Asia Command crashed in the French Alps in 1944, killing all on board. A memorial window to George Mallory along with a memorial plaque to Trafford can be found at St Wilfrid's Church, Mobberley, where their father, Herbert, grandfather, also called George, and other family members had served as rector. Mallory's daughter, Frances Clare, married physiologist Glenn Allan Millikan, who was killed in a climbing accident in Fall Creek Falls State Park, Tennessee.

Frances Mallory's son, Richard Millikan, became a respected climber during the 1960s and '70s. Mallory's grandson, also named George Mallory, reached the summit of Everest in 1995 via the North Ridge with six other climbers as part of the American Everest Expedition of 1995. He left a picture of his grandparents at the summit, citing "unfinished business".

See also
 List of people who died climbing Mount Everest
 List of solved missing person cases
 List of unsolved deaths

References

Bibliography

Further reading

 Anker, Conrad & Roberts, David (1999). The Lost Explorer – Finding Mallory on Mount Everest. London: Simon & Schuster
 Archer, Jeffrey (2009). Paths of Glory. New York: St Martin's Press  (novel about Mallory's life and summit attempt)
 Davis, Wade (2011).  Into The Silence: The Great War, Mallory and the Conquest of Everest Bodley Head 
 Firstbrook, Peter (1999). Lost on Everest: The Search for Mallory & Irvine. BBC Worldwide
 Gillman, Peter and Leni (2000). The Wildest Dream: Mallory, His Life and Conflicting Passions. London: Headline (winner, Boardman Tasker Prize)
 Hemmleb, Jochen; Johnson, Larry A.; Simonson, Eric R. & Nothdurft, William E. (1999.) Ghosts of Everest – the Search for Mallory & Irvine. Seattle: Mountaineers Books (Story of the 1999 expedition that located Mallory's body)
 Hemmleb, Jochen, & Simonson, Eric R. (2002). Detectives on Everest: the Story of the 2001 Mallory & Irvine Research Expedition. Seattle: Mountaineers Books (Sequel to Ghosts of Everest, with new discoveries on Everest and revelations regarding the fate of Andrew Irvine)
 Holzel, Tom & Salkeld, Audrey (1986). The Mystery of Mallory & Irvine. Revised edition: Seattle: Mountaineers Books, 1999
 Neale, Jonathan, "Tigers of the Snow: How One Fateful Climb Made the Sherpas Mountaineering Legends", Thomas Dunne Books, 2002
 Robertson, David (1969). George Mallory. Revised edition 1999. (Biography written by Mallory's son-in-law, married to Beridge.) Faber and Faber Selected edition: Paperback 1999, with foreword by Joe Simpson 
 Summers, Julie (2000). Fearless on Everest: the Quest for Sandy Irvine. (Republished 2008)

External links

 
 
 Ghosts of Everest – New evidence examined. 1999 Expedition finds Mallory's remains; tries to reconstruct Mallory's ascent. From Outside Magazine
 Lost on Everest – In January 2000, PBS broadcast the story of the 1999 Nova expedition to locate the bodies of George Mallory and Andrew Irvine.
 Peter H. Hansen, 'Mallory, George Herbert Leigh (1886–1924)’, Oxford Dictionary of National Biography, Oxford University Press, 2004, brief biographical entry.
 Interactive panorama of The Second Step on Everest's Northeast Ridge.
 2004 Expedition to find the cameras
 Mount Everest 1924 photographs – John Noel's photographs from the 1924 expedition.
 
 Photo of Mallory Court, Magdalene College, Cambridge
 Mallory's rowing career and account of the 1907 Boat Race, with photo [NB that caption incorrectly states that Mallory rowed in Oxford/Cambridge boat race.]
 Tom Holzel's 2008 theory that Odell saw Mallory descending at the First Step
 Mike Parsons and Mary B. Rose. Mallory Myths and Mysteries: The Mallory Replica Project
 Mallory and Irvine Memorials
 
The George Mallory Award – Wasatch Mountain Film Festival

1886 births
1920s missing person cases
1924 deaths
20th-century explorers
Academics of the Institute of Continuing Education
Alumni of Magdalene College, Cambridge
British Army personnel of World War I
English explorers
English mountain climbers
Formerly missing people
English LGBT people
Missing person cases in China
Mountaineering deaths on Mount Everest
Mummies
People educated at Winchester College
People from Mobberley
Royal Garrison Artillery officers
Sportspeople from Cheshire
Unsolved deaths